Syed Farid (born 1984) is an Indian football player. He is currently playing for United Sikkim F.C. in the I-League 2nd Division  as a defender.

External links
 Profile at Goal.com
 

Indian footballers
1984 births
Living people
People from Imphal
Footballers from Manipur
I-League players
Air India FC players
United Sikkim F.C. players
Association football defenders